Sir James Angus Rhoderick Neil McGrigor, 6th Baronet (born 19 October 1949) is a Scottish Conservative Party politician, who is a councillor in Argyll and Bute. He had previously been a Member of the Scottish Parliament (MSP) for the Highlands and Islands region from 1999 until 2016.

Early life and career 
McGrigor was born in London in 1949 and educated at Cladich Primary School in Argyll and privately at Eton College. He studied Commercial French at the University of Neuchâtel in Switzerland. After graduating, he worked in finance in the City of London and in the shipping sector in Glasgow. He also farmed sheep and cattle, and started a trout farm in Argyll in the early 1970s.

Political career
McGrigor stood unsuccessfully for the Western Isles in the 1997 general election. He fought Argyll and Bute in 2005, finishing second, and fought the equivalent seat in the 2007 Scottish Parliament election, finishing third.

He served as Scottish Conservative spokesperson for fisheries, and communities and sport. He is also an Honorary Vice-President of English-Speaking Union Scotland.

McGrigor was also the driving force behind the establishment of the Scottish Register of Tartans. His Member's Bill was given support by the Scottish Government and was subsequently passed by the Scottish Parliament on 9 October 2008. This makes McGrigor one of the first MSPs to have passed a Private Member's Bill through the Scottish Parliament.

In 2017, he stood in the Argyll and Bute Council election and was elected to the Oban South and the Isles ward.

Family
McGrigor is the eldest son of the late Sir Charles McGrigor, 5th Bt, by his wife Mary Bettine (the historian Mary McGrigor), daughter of Sir Charles Edmonstone, 6th Baronet. He is descended patrilineally from Sir James McGrigor, 1st Baronet, Wellington's Surgeon General serving the British Army in Spain during the Peninsular campaign, who received a baronetcy in 1831. Another distinguished relative was the late Admiral of the Fleet Sir Rhoderick McGrigor, grandson of the second Baronet and thus his first cousin twice removed.

Jamie became the 6th Baronet upon the death of his father, Sir Charles, on 1 October 2007.

He has been twice married and has six children. His son Alexander James Edward Lyon (born 1998), by his second marriage, is his heir apparent.

References

Bibliography

External links 
 
 Jamie McGrigor MSP profile Scottish Conservative Party
 Jamie McGrigor MSP profile Conservative Party

1949 births
Living people
People educated at Eton College
Baronets in the Baronetage of the United Kingdom
Conservative MSPs
Members of the Scottish Parliament 1999–2003
Members of the Scottish Parliament 2003–2007
Members of the Scottish Parliament 2007–2011
Members of the Scottish Parliament 2011–2016
University of Neuchâtel alumni
Members of the Royal Company of Archers
Scottish Conservative Party parliamentary candidates
Scottish expatriates in Switzerland
People educated at Sunningdale School